Crosstown is an unincorporated community in Brown County, in the U.S. state of Ohio.

History
A post office was established at Crosstown in 1881, and remained in operation until 1907.

References

Unincorporated communities in Brown County, Ohio
1881 establishments in Ohio
Populated places established in 1881
Unincorporated communities in Ohio